Ma Fulu (1900–1969) was a Peking opera singer known for his "educated clown" roles (wénchǒu). He served as a mentor to Li Yuru.


References

Citations

Bibliography
 .

External links
 "马富禄" on Baike.com 

1900 births
1969 deaths
20th-century Chinese male actors
Chinese male Peking opera actors
20th-century Chinese  male  singers
Singers from Beijing
Male actors from Beijing
Chou actors